The Wolfe Tones are an Irish rebel music band that incorporate Irish traditional music in their songs. Formed in 1963, they take their name from Theobald Wolfe Tone, one of the leaders of the Irish Rebellion of 1798, with the double meaning of a wolf tone – a spurious sound that can affect instruments of the violin family.

History

1963–1964: Formation
The origins of the group date back to August 1963, where three neighbouring children from the Dublin suburb of Inchicore, Brian Warfield, Noel Nagle, and Liam Courtney, had been musical friends from childhood. In August 1964 Brian's brother Derek Warfield joined the band, and in November 1964 Tommy Byrne replaced Courtney, creating the band's most recognizable line-up, which would last for nearly 37 years until January 2001.

1964–2001
In 1989, a contract was signed by Derek Warfield, signing rights to an American distributor, Shanachie Records. The contents of this contract were apparently misrepresented to the other members of the band, resulting in a clause that prevented them from recording any new material. Unable to reverse this agreement, they continued to tour, albeit without any new material.

In 1995, Derek Warfield released a solo studio album entitled Legacy as he was still eligible to record under his own name. With Derek on vocals and mandolin, the music on this album was performed by a new band, although he was still touring with the Wolfe Tones. Derek's solo releases continued annually until 2006.

In 2001, after a show played in Limerick, Derek Warfield departed the band to concentrate on his own career. Calling themselves "Brian Warfield, Tommy Byrne and Noel Nagle, formerly of the Wolfe Tones" the three would later go on to release "You'll Never Beat the Irish" and the more recent album "Child of Destiny".

2001–present
The Wolfe Tones continue to tour, but as a three-piece band comprising Brian Warfield, Noel Nagle and Tommy Byrne.

The Wolfe Tones celebrated their 45th Anniversary with a special event at the Waterfront Hall, Belfast, on 26 October 2008, which was also filmed for a documentary. In 2014 they celebrated their 50th anniversary by performing at the Citywest Hotel and Conference Centre in a series of Easter weekend concerts.

In 2018, they headlined the Féile an Phobail in West Belfast to a sell-out audience of over 12,000 people and were inducted into the Barrowlands hall of fame for their contribution to music. At the end of each December, the Wolfe Tones perform three concerts at Dublin's Citywest Hotel.

Notable works 
The song "Irish Eyes" was written by Brian Warfield as a paean for his mother Kathleen who died of cancer the year previous to its release. A song about emigration to London entitled "My Heart is in Ireland"  became a number 2 hit for the band. The song Celtic Symphony was written by Warfield in 1987 for the centennial of Celtic Football Club. Other famous songs written by the group include "Joe McDonnell", a song about the life and death of the Provisional IRA member Joe McDonnell who was the fifth person to die on the 1981 Hunger Strike; and "The Protestant Men", a song about some of the notable Protestant Irish nationalists. The band also covered "The Streets of New York" which Liam Reilly from Bagatelle wrote, inspired by stories of the Tones' friendship with NYPD. Warfield also penned his rendition of "The Helicopter Song" which was written by Sean (Jobby) Mc Ginley. "The Helicopter Song" stands as the fastest selling single of all time in Ireland, shooting straight to number one in 1974 as a result of the escape from Mountjoy Jail.

Footballer James McClean (of Sunderland at the time) attracted criticism when he tweeted that he listened to their song "The Broad Black Brimmer" before a match, a song in which a son learns of how his father was killed in fighting for the IRA. He was told by club manager Martin O'Neill to refrain from using Twitter.

In 2002, after an allegedly orchestrated e-mail campaign by fans to "try and mess it up" their rendition of "A Nation Once Again" by Thomas Osborne Davis was voted the number one song of all time in a BBC World Service poll. The BBC hosts an artist's page for the band that includes excerpts of their songs.

The band's 1982 hit "Admiral William Brown" pays homage to the Irish-born Argentine naval hero William Brown.

In January 2020, the band's version of "Come Out Ye Black and Tans" reached No. 1 on the Ireland and UK iTunes charts, following criticism of the Irish government's planned commemoration of the RIC, as part of its 'Decade of Commemoration'. As a result of this, on 10 January, the song entered the Irish Singles Chart at No. 33 and also debuted at No. 1 in the Scottish Singles Chart.

Personnel

Members

Current members
 Noel Nagle – tin whistle, low whistle, uileann pipes, vocals (1963–present)
 Brian Warfield – banjo, whistle, harp, piano, guitars, bodhran, vocals (1963–present)
 Tommy Byrne – guitars, vocals (1964–present)

Former members
 Liam Courtney – guitars, vocals (1963–1964)
 Derek Warfield – mandolin, vocals (1964–2001)

Lineups

Discography

Studio albums

 The Foggy Dew (1965)
 Up the Rebels (1966)
 The Rights of Man (1968)
 Rifles of the I.R.A. (1970)
 Let the People Sing (1972)
 'Till Ireland a Nation (1974)
 Irish to the Core (1976)
 Across the Broad Atlantic (1976)
 Belt of the Celts (1978)
 Spirit of the Nation (1981)
 As Gaeilge (1982)
 A Sense of Freedom (1983)
 Profile (1985)
 Sing Out for Ireland (1987)
 25th Anniversary (1989)
 You'll Never Beat the Irish (2001)
 The Troubles (2004)
 Child of Destiny (2011)
 The Dublin Rebellion 1916 (2016)

References

External links
 DMC Promotions
 Wolfe Tones Fest

Irish folk musical groups
Musical groups established in 1963
Musical groups from Dublin (city)
Political music groups
1963 establishments in Ireland